Mahadhi Juma Maalim (born 28 March 1972) is a Tanzanian CCM politician and Member of Parliament for Muyuni constituency from November 2010 to October 2015. He is the former Deputy Minister of Foreign Affairs and International Co-operation. He was an Ambassador of the United Republic of Tanzania to the State of Kuwait and is currently Ambassador of the United Republic of Tanzania to the State of Qatar

Honours and awards

Honorary degrees
University of Dar es Salaam, November 2013

References

1972 births
Living people
Tanzanian Muslims
Chama Cha Mapinduzi MPs
Tanzanian MPs 2010–2015
Deputy government ministers of Tanzania
Tabora Boys Secondary School alumni
University of Dar es Salaam alumni
University of Cape Town alumni